The women's lightweight (62 kilograms) event at the 2014 Asian Games took place on 2 October 2014 at Ganghwa Dolmens Gymnasium, Incheon, South Korea.

A total of ten competitors from ten different countries (NOCs) competed in this event, limited to fighters whose body weight was less than 62 kilograms.

Lee Da-bin of South korea won the gold medal.

Schedule
All times are Korea Standard Time (UTC+09:00)

Results 
Legend
W — Won by withdrawal

References

External links
Official website

Taekwondo at the 2014 Asian Games